Live Stuff is a 1999 live album by Holly McNarland. The album is a compilation of recordings of McNarland's performances on June 6, 1998 in Las Vegas and July 15, 1998 at the Phoenix Concert Theatre in Toronto. It also includes a cover of Phil Collins' In the Air Tonight recorded in-studio (though it's one she has often performed live).

Track listing
"Water" (McNarland, Pullyblank)
"Numb" (McNarland)
"The Box" (McNarland)
"I Won't Stay" (McNarland)
"Elmo" (McNarland)
"Stormy" (McNarland)
"In the Air Tonight" (Collins)

References

1999 EPs
Holly McNarland albums
Live EPs
1999 live albums